Jammie Deese (born May 10, 1977) is an American football coach and former American football wide receiver. He played college football for the Wake Forest Demon Deacons, then played professionally for the Carolina Cobras in the Arena Football League and Fayetteville Guard in the National Indoor Football League. From 2016 to 2019, he was the offensive coordinator for the college football program at West Florida, helping them win a Division II national championship in 2019. Since 2020, he has been the head coach at Forest Hills High School in Marshville, North Carolina.

References

1977 births
Living people
Players of American football from North Carolina
American football wide receivers
Washington Redskins players
Wake Forest Demon Deacons football players
Carolina Cobras players
Coaches of American football from North Carolina
UNC Pembroke Braves football coaches
West Florida Argonauts football coaches
High school football coaches in North Carolina